Sima Tan (165–110 BCE) was a Chinese astronomer/astrologer and historian during the Western Han dynasty. His work Records of the Grand Historian was completed by his son Sima Qian, who is considered the founder of Chinese historiography.

Education & career
Sima Tan studied astronomy with Tang Du, the I Ching under Yang He, and Daoism under Master Huang.

He was appointed to the office of Court Astronomer at age 25 in 140 BCE, a position which he held until his death.

An essay by him has survived within the Records of the Grand Historian. In this essay within the larger work, Sima Tan describes six philosophical lineages or "schools" (家 jiā):
 Confucianism (儒家 Rú jiā)
 Daoism (道家 Dào jiā)
 Legalism (法家 Fǎ jiā)
 Mohism (墨家 Mò jiā)
 School of Names (名家 Míng jiā)
 School of Naturalists (陰陽家/阴阳家 Yīnyáng jiā) (central figure Zou Yan)
The categorization of earlier philosophers into these six schools was fairly original. As for his assessment of these schools, it is rather biased towards Daoism, as Sima Tan was a follower of Huang-Lao, an early Han form of Daoism.
Although Sima Tan began writing the Records of the Grand Historian (Shiji), he died before it was finished; it was completed by his son, Sima Qian.

The year of Sima Tan's death (110 BCE) was the year of the great imperial sacrifice fengshan (:zh:封禅) by Emperor Han Wudi, for which the emperor appointed another person to the rank of fangshi, bypassing Sima, probably causing him much consternation.

See also
Sima Qian
Shiji
Daoism

References
   (pbk ed.)
 
 

160s BC births
110 BC deaths
2nd-century BC Chinese people
2nd-century BC Chinese historians
Ancient astrologers
Chinese astrologers
Han dynasty historians
Year of birth unknown